Cathy Brown (born 28 July 1970) is a British sports coach and former professional boxer who competed from 1999 to 2006. She challenged for multiple world championships during her career; the WIBF bantamweight title twice in 2002 and 2004; the WIBF flyweight title in 2003; and the WBC female flyweight title in 2005. At regional level, she challenged once for the European female flyweight title in 2003.

She regularly writes columns for Men's Health and Women's Health magazine.

Background 
Brown was born on 28 July 1970. She was put into a Catholic Care orphanage until she was adopted at an early age by her adoptive parents and raised in Lanchester, Durham.  In 1992 she moved to London to pursue her photographic career as a Forensic Photographer, as which she worked until 1998.

Early career 
She started Kickboxing in 1992 as a hobby and only after three months her trainer suggested that she should enter her first competition. She remained undefeated for 25 fights, winning both the BKBU and WBFo British Kick Boxing title.

Boxing career 
Brown received her professional boxing license in August 1998.

Her first fight was a points win against Veerle Braspenningx from Belgium in Oct 1999 and won the WBFo European flyweight title in July 2000.

In June 2002 she went for the WIBF International bantamweight title against Alina Shaternikiova, but lost.

She fought Stephanie Bianchini for the European female flyweight title in December 2003, however, controversially lost on points. She fought a rematch against Stephanie Bianchini for the WBC female flyweight title in August 2005 in Italy, but lost again on points.

On 24 September 2006, Brown won the English female bantamweight title when she defeated Juliette Winter by a ten-round 97–94 decision in a rematch of their 2003 four-rounder. With the win, Brown became the first female champion sanctioned by the British Boxing Board of Control. After the fight, she stated that she would retire from competition because of persistent wrist and neck injuries.

Professional boxing record

Other / Current activities 

Brown is currently focusing on her coaching career as a boxing coach and Cognitive Behavioural Therapist at the Third Space gym. She has participated in various challenges such as sailing across the Atlantic in a world record attempt and took part in a 120 km running and climbing event for Sparks Charity. 

As an ambassador for The Lotus Flower Charity, Brown visited refugee camps in Iraq in 2019 to teach Yazidi women how to box.

References 

1970 births
Sportspeople from Leeds
Living people
English women boxers
World boxing champions
English female kickboxers